Mount Northampton is a mountain that rises above the central part of the ridge just east of Bowers Glacier in the Victory Mountains, Victoria Land. Discovered in January 1841 by Sir James Clark Ross, who named it for the Marquess of Northampton, then President of the Royal Society.

Mountains of Victoria Land
Borchgrevink Coast